Pizza Deliverance is the second album released by Alabama rock band Drive-By Truckers, released in 1999. It was recorded with high spirits in five days at Patterson Hood's house.  The album was mixed by Andy LeMaster. The album cover art was created by Jim Stacy. The album was re-released by New West Records on January 25, 2005 along with the band's first studio effort, Gangstabilly.

Hood dedicated the album to Arthur Alexander, Sam Phillips and Jerry Wexler.

After the release of Pizza Deliverance the band began touring some 150 dates in as little as six months.  It was during the beginning of the tour that Brad Morgan replaced Matt Lane on drums due to Lane's decision to focus more on his own band, The Possibilities.  Most of Drive-By Trucker's breakthrough album, Southern Rock Opera, was written while the band toured in support of Pizza Deliverance.

Pizza Deliverance saw guitarist Mike Cooley's first major contributions to the band (aside from Gangstabilly's "Panties In Your Purse") as his songwriting and lyrical style continued to develop.  An alternate (and more electric) version of Cooley's "Uncle Frank" was recorded during The Dirty South sessions and can be heard on The Fine Print: A Collection of Oddities and Rarities.

Track listing
Bulldozers and Dirt – 4:29 (Hood)
Nine Bullets – 4:05 (Hood)
Uncle Frank – 5:29 (Cooley)
Too Much Sex (Too Little Jesus) – 3:16	(Hood)
Box of Spiders – 3:30 (Hood)
One of These Days – 5:15 (Cooley)
Margo and Harold – 4:51 (Hood) 
The Company I Keep – 7:02 (Hood)
The President's Penis Is Missing – 4:12 (Hood)
Tales Facing Up – 5:03 (Hood)
Love Like This – 5:23 (Cooley)
Mrs. Dubose – 5:40 (Malone)
Zoloft – 3:17 (Hood) 
The Night G.G. Allin Came to Town – 4:50 (Hood)

Personnel

Band
Mike Cooley – lyrics, guitar, banjo, bass, harmonica, vocals
Patterson Hood – lyrics, guitar, mandolin, bass, vocals
Rob Malone – lyrics, guitar, bass, vocals
Matt Lane – drums

Guest performers
John Neff - pedal steel guitar
Barry Sell - mandolin on "Margo and Harold"
Earl Hicks - snare drum on "Love Like This" and "Mrs Dubose"
Adam Howell - upright bass on "Margo and Harold" and "Zoloft"

References

Drive-By Truckers albums
1999 albums
New West Records albums